Igea is a village in Spain.

Igea may also refer to:

Francisco Igea, Spanish politician
Interactive Games and Entertainment Association, an Australian video game association

See also
Egea (disambiguation)